Peter Reynolds (January 12, 1958 – October 11, 2016) was a Welsh composer known for founding PM Music Ensemble. In addition, he was recognised by Guinness World Records as having written with writer Simon Rees the shortest opera on Earth, Sands of Time; a three-minute and thirty-four second long piece. He died on 11 October 2016 at his home in Cardiff.

Biography

Peter was born to Dorothy and John Reynolds in 1958. Peter studied in Cardiff, Wales, and lived in South Wales, and was the artistic director of the Lower Machen Festival in Monmouthshire from 1998 to 2009. He received bursaries to study at the Dartington International Summer School with Peter Maxwell Davies in 1984, Morton Feldman in 1986, and Gordon Cross in 1987. Peter gave many composition workshops ranging from schools’ Year 9 through to teaching composition at both undergraduate and post-graduate level at Cardiff's Royal Welsh College of Music & Drama from 2002 - 2016. Peter was the Musical Director of the Splott Ladies Choir during the 1990s, and he often ran workshops in combination with many different ensembles.

St David's Hall Composition Series

Between September and December 2014, Peter ran a series of composition workshops for young composers once a month on Saturdays at St David's Hall.

Young Composer of Dyfed

Young Composer of Dyfed is one of the great undiscovered secrets of Wales – a scheme in which young composers in Carmarthenshire, Ceredigion and Pembrokeshire work with top, often international, quality players on their compositions. Peter was involved with the scheme adjudicating and mentoring composers since 2006 and was then composer-in-residence from 2010–13, spending each winter working in schools across Dyfed and with ensembles including Piano Circus, the Brodowski Quartet and Farthingale Ensemble. Take a look at their website.

PM Music Ensemble Workshops

PM Music Ensemble is a performing group devoted to contemporary music that Peter set up and ran from 1991. They ran an extensive education programme of composition workshops for various organisations including:
Cardiff University School of Music (from 1994)
ESTA Composition for School Teachers (2003)
Go West Festival (1995)
Junior Guildhall School of Music (London) (2003)
Late Music Festival (York) (2002)
Royal Welsh College of Music & Drama (Composition Dept and Junior Music Dept) (2002–09)
Waterford New Music Week, Ireland (Residencies in 2004 & 2007)
Vale of Glamorgan Festival (1999-2000)

BBC National Orchestra of Wales

Analysis workshops for A Level students on Schubert's C major Quintet with the Corinthian String Quartet (Cardiff & Bangor, 1997)

Awards

1986 Michael Tippett Award for Composition, 
1986 Glanville Jones Award for Outstanding Achievement in Welsh Music (Welsh Music Guild)

Compositions

1980 - 1989

Lullaby (1981). Mezzo-soprano & piano. Words: W.H Auden
Borrowed Time (1983–88). Fl, ob, cl, vln, vc, perc & piano
Shifts (1984). Fl. ob. cl, perc (1 player)
Unison (1986). 2 clarinets
Diaphony (1986/7 rev. 1992). Chamber orchestra
Moonsongs (1987–91). Fl, vln, vc & piano
Bye, baby bunting (1987–93). String Trio
Bell Patterns (1988). Solo viola
String Sextet (1988). 2 vln, 2 va, 2 vc

1990 - 1999

Dumpe (1990). Viola & piano
Tango (1993). Piano solo
Variations (1993). Cello & piano
The Sands of Time – An Opera in Four Minutes (1993) Soprano and Baritone, chorus of 4 sopranos. flute, 2 oboes, 2 saxophones, bassoon, trumpet, percussion (or with piano accompaniment)
Serenata I (1994). Flute & guitar
Serenata II (1994). Oboe & piano
Old King Cole (1994). Vln, vc, fl, cl, pno
Turtle Soup (1994). Two-part song for children's voices with piano. Words: Lewis Carroll
So soft this morning, ours (1995). Violin & piano
Now Goeth Sun under Wood (1995). Female chorus (SSA). Words: Anon, Medieval
String Quartet No.1 (1996) 2 vln, vla, vc
Hold not thy peace and be not still (1997). Fl, vc & pno
The House of Alcinous (1997). Mezzo-soprano, vc & pno. Words adapted from Homer's Odyssey
A New Year Carol (1997). Two-part song for children's voices with piano, words Anon.
Ngòmbí Song (1998). Clarinet & piano
Near Nicosia, Sicily, July 28, 1943 (1998). Madrigal for soprano, mezzo-soprano, tenor, bass. Words: Geoff Dyer
Cheap Labour (1999). 2 euphoniums & 2 tubas. 
Serenata III (1999/2003). Strings
Serenata III (1999). Vln, vc, fl, cl, pno (or harp)

2000 - 2009

Suite (2000). Solo cello
Barnacles (2000). Two-part song for children's voices with piano, words by Martin Riley
Prelude & Finale (from Suite for Cello) (2000). Solo cello
Urban Songs (2002). Soprano, fl, cl, vc & pno (Also available for soprano with piano accompaniment). Words: Adey Grummet
Nocturnes for Wind Quintet (2002). Fl, ob, cl, hn & bsn.
Heartfelt Songs (2004). Soprano, fl, cl, vln, vc & pno. Words: Adey Grummet
Sometimes there is a hoar frost... (2008)
Lullaby (2009). For organ, keyboard or any two appropriate instruments
In One Spot (2009). Piano solo
Beiliheulog (2009). Fl, vla, guit (or harp)
Three Wang Wei Songs (2009). Soprano (unaccompanied). Words: Wang Wei

2010-2016

Far down in the forest (2010). Three solo piano pieces for children based on the tales of Hans Christian Andersen
The Head of Brass (2010). Narrator & saxophone quartet (sop, alto, ten & bass). Words: Simon Rees
Canons for the Longest Day (2010). Strings and two off-stage violins
Only the Stars Remember (2010). Soprano & pno. Words: Maria Garner
Bayvil (2011). Piano solo
Adieu to all Alluring Toys (2011). Baritone & pno. Words: Anon.
Cairn (2011). Harp (also available in a version for soprano saxophone & cello)
Epithalamion (2011). Piano solo
footsteps quiet in the shadows (String Quartet No.2) (2012). 2 vln, vla, vc.
Three Winter Haiku (2012). Mezzo-soprano & piano
Ecco Mormorar L’onde (2013). Piano solo
Moon-ark (2013). Solo cello & strings 
Partrishow (2014). fl (db. alto), vln, guit, cb. (instrumentalists double singing bowls)
Terry Dactyl and the Meteor Seven(2014). A performance work for 4-7 year olds. Narrator & brass trio (tpt, hn, & tbn or tuba). Words: Francesca Kay
Cippyn (2015). Piano & electronics. Studio recording by Duncan Honeybourne
Cippyn (2015). Double bass and electronics. Duration: 12’. Film by Aaron J Cooper, director Heledd Wyn Hardy with Ashley John Long
Penllyn (2016) for piano
Le Gros Horloge (2016) for clarinet, violin, and piano

References

External links

 Biography of Peter Reynolds

1958 births
2016 deaths
20th-century classical composers
21st-century classical composers
Welsh classical composers
Welsh male classical composers
20th-century British composers
20th-century British male musicians
20th-century British musicians
21st-century British male musicians